Chrisman may refer to:

Chrisman (surname)
Chrisman, Illinois, city in Edgar County, Illinois, United States
Chrisman, Ohio, unincorporated community in Madison County, Ohio, United States